Deadwater Fell is a four-part British drama television miniseries written and created by Daisy Coulam. It stars David Tennant as a doctor whose wife and three young children are murdered in a fire. It premiered 10 January 2020 on Channel 4.

Premise
Tragedy strikes in a remote Scottish village when a fire rages out of control at the Kendrick home, killing a mother and her three young children. Only the father, the village doctor, is pulled out alive, but all five were drugged. Investigators search for a motive as they discover this seemingly ideal family was far from happy.

Cast
 David Tennant as Tom Kendrick
 Cush Jumbo as Jess Milner
 Matthew McNulty as Police Sergeant Steve Campbell
 Anna Madeley as Kate Kendrick
 Maureen Beattie as Carol Kendrick
 Jamie Michie as Simon Wells
 Laurie Brett as DC Gemma Darlington
 Gordon Brown as DCI Spencer Collins
 Lorn Macdonald as PC Taylor Clarke
 Lindy Whiteford as Ruth McKenzie
 Ron Donachie as Callum McKenzie
 Orla Russell as Emily Kendrick
 Seline Hizli as Sacha
 Jack Greenlees as Luke
 Lewis Gribben as Dylan Denham-Johnson
Aaron Connell as Elliott Campbell 
Bradley Connell as Lewis Campbell

Production
Channel 4 commissioned the four-part series in January 2019. It was produced by Kudos, part of the Endemol Shine Group. David Tennant and Cush Jumbo were announced as the leads in June, with Matthew McNulty cast as well. Tennant is also an executive producer.

Filming began in June 2019 in Dunlop, Ayrshire, which stood in for the fictional village of Kirkdarroch. Other filming locations included Culzean Country Park; Gateside Place in Kilbarchan, Cumbernauld House Park in Cumbernauld, North Lanarkshire;  Irvine Beach and the Low Green Park in Irvine, North Ayrshire. It was directed by Lynsey Miller of Kilwinning, Ayrshire.

Episodes

Reception
The first episode of Deadwater Fell received positive reviews from critics. David Craig of Radio Times gave it four out of five stars, calling it a "complex and fascinating mystery." He praised screenwriter Daisy Coulam for fleshing out the characters, particularly Kate Kendrick (Anna Madeley): "While Deadwater Fell might initially sound like another case of 'disposable woman' in the crime genre, writer Daisy Coulam deserves recognition for elevating the character of Kate above such a trope."

Lucy Mangan of The Guardian likewise rated it four out of five stars, comparing it positively to Broadchurch: "Whether it will catch the public imagination like Broadchurch did is anybody's guess. It feels far more solidly engineered, easily as convincing in its portrait of a small community suddenly shattered by an awful event, and it elicits more emotional investment from the off. I'm finding it an irresistible treat, but these things are essentially alchemical and unpredictable. Broadchurch with freckles – think of it like that if it'll help. Come on in; the Deadwaters lovely."

References

External links 
 
 Deadwater Fell at Channel 4
 Interview with David Tennant at Channel 4

2020s British crime drama television series
2020 British television series debuts
2020 British television series endings
Channel 4 television dramas
English-language television shows
2020s British television miniseries
Television shows set in Scotland
Television series by Endemol
Television shows scored by Natalie Holt